Barbara Bry (born April 9, 1949) is an American businesswoman and politician in San Diego, California. She served as a member of the San Diego City Council representing City Council District 1 from 2016 to 2020 and was a candidate for mayor of San Diego in the 2020 election. The district includes the communities of Carmel Valley, Del Mar Heights, Del Mar Mesa, Pacific Highlands Ranch, La Jolla, Torrey Hills, Torrey Pines, University City, and the University of California, San Diego campus. Bry served as President Pro Tem of the City Council from 2017 to 2020. She is a Democrat, although city offices are officially nonpartisan.

Early life and education 
Bry was born and raised in Philadelphia. She earned a bachelor's and master's degree from the University of Pennsylvania, followed by a Master of Business Administration from Harvard Business School.

Career

Business 
Prior to running for elected office for the first time in 2016, Barbara worked at Connect, a venture capital group. She then became an entrepreneur and served on the initial management team of ProFlowers.

In 1998, Bry founded Athena San Diego, an organization for women in the tech and life sciences community. In 2008, Bry founded Run Women Run, an organization that recruits and trains pro-choice women to seek elected and appointed office.

San Diego City Council
Bry was a candidate for the city council's first district in the 2016 San Diego City Council election, as incumbent Sherri Lightner was ineligible to run due to term limits. Bry, a Democrat, was expected to run against Republican Ray Ellis and Democrat Joe LaCava to replace Lightner. However, LaCava announced that he would not run.

Since no candidate received a majority of the votes in the June primary, Bry and Ellis were slated to advance to the November runoff election. However, on August 12, 2016, Ellis announced that he would be withdrawing from the election. Despite effectively conceding the race, Ellis's name still appeared on November ballot. Bry was then elected to the City Council in November.

Bry served as Council President Pro Tem beginning in December 2017. She has taken action on several issues including short term vacation rentals, dockless vehicles, community choice energy, and establishing the Workplace Equity Initiative.

In 2020, as part of her campaign for Mayor of San Diego, Bry sent a mass email to donors with the inflammatory subject line, "They're coming for our homes!" This message, intended to criticize the YIMBY (Yes in My Backyard) movement as a threat to the rights of homeowners, and the city's neighborhood character. This triggered immediate criticism from the local Democratic Party organizations. In addition, the chair of the San Diego Climate Action Campaign responded that "Housing policy is climate policy. You cannot be a NIMBY and be a climate champion or comply with our Climate Action Plan.”

Committee assignments 
 Budget and Government Efficiency Committee (chair)
 Budget Review Committee (chair)
 Economic Development and Intergovernmental Relations Committee
 Environment Committee
 Public Safety and Livable Neighborhoods Committee (Vice Chair)
 Rules Committee (Vice Chair)

Personal life 
Bry has lived in San Diego for 40 years and is married to entrepreneur Neil Senturia. They have raised two daughters and are now grandparents. They are of Jewish faith.

Electoral history

2016 San Diego City Council

2020 Mayor of San Diego

Notes

References

External links
 City of San Diego: Barbara Bry website

1949 births
21st-century American politicians
21st-century American women politicians
California Democrats
Harvard Business School alumni
Living people
People from La Jolla, San Diego
Politicians from Philadelphia
San Diego City Council members
University of Pennsylvania alumni
Women city councillors in California